Back of da Club is a song by American singer Mashonda from her debut studio album January Joy (2005). It was released as the lead single from the album in October 2005. It is the only single by Mashonda available on iTunes. The CD single track listing comes in MP3 format.

Track listing
 Back Of Da Club (Radio Edit)
 Instrumental
 Call Out Hook

Chart positions
The song debuted at number 86 on the Hot R&B/Hip-Hop Songs chart.

Charts

References

2005 songs
2005 debut singles
Song recordings produced by Swizz Beatz
Songs written by Swizz Beatz